John Michael Godier (b. mid 1970s) is an American science fiction author, science communicator, futurist and YouTuber who explores the universe in weekly documentary videos centered on future technology and the potential for advanced extraterrestrial life in the universe. As of March 2023, he has 338,000 on his personal channel and 262,000 subscribers on his interview channel Event Horizon. Event Horizon publishes interviews with some of the most well-known scientists in the world, including Nobel-winning physicist Frank Wilczek, NASA Chief Scientist James Green and the Harvard Professor Avi Loeb.

Bibliography
 Supermind. Chalin and Harris, 2017. 
 Rescue at Io (The Salvagers) . Chalin and Harris Books, 2013
 The Salvagers''. Chalin and Harris Books, 2013.

See also

References

External links
 Godier's futurist YouTube channel
 Godier's interview channel Event Horizon
 Twitter

American YouTubers
Living people
Year of birth missing (living people)
Place of birth missing (living people)
Science communicators
Educational and science YouTubers